Tuss is a surname. Notable people with the surname include:

Miklós Tuss (1898–1978), Hungarian sailor
Réka Tuss (born 1977), Hungarian alpine skier
Stefan Tuss (born 1988), German Nordic combined skier

See also
 Duso

German-language surnames